Le Bic is a former municipality in Quebec, Canada.

On September 16, 2009, it was merged into the City of Rimouski.

References

Former municipalities in Quebec
Rimouski
Communities in Bas-Saint-Laurent
Populated places disestablished in 2009